Compton is a village in Brooklyn Township, Lee County, Illinois, United States. The population was 303 at the 2010 census, down from 347 in 2000.

History
A post office at the site of Compton opened on May 18, 1841; it was named Melugin Grove after the village's first settler, Zachariah Melugin. The village's name was changed to Compton on July 16, 1873, after Joel Compton.

Geography
Compton is located on the plains of north central Illinois. The town is served by US Route 30 & US Route 51 and is about ten miles north of Mendota.

Demographics

As of the census of 2000, there were 347 people, 127 households, and 96 families residing in the village. The population density was 2,092.1 person per square mile (788.1/km). The racial makeup of the village was 98.85% White, 0.29% Asian, 0.58% from other races, and 0.29% from two or more races. Hispanic or Latino of any race were 2.31% of the population.

There were 127 households, out of which 43.3% had children under the age of 18 living with them, 63.8% were married couples living together, 11.0% had a female householder with no husband present, and 24.4% were non-families. 21.3% of all households were made up of individuals, and 7.9% had someone living alone who was 65 years of age or older. The average household size was 2.73 and the average family size was 3.17.

In the village, the population was spread out, with 30.8% under the age of 18, 6.9% from 18 to 24, 32.0% from 25 to 44, 19.0% from 45 to 64, and 11.2% who were 65 years of age or older. The median age was 33 years. For every 100 females, there were 102.9 males. For every 100 females age 18 and over, there were 96.7 males.

The median income for a household in the village was $34,167, and the median income for a family was $39,375. Males had a median income of $31,250 versus $22,188 for females. The per capita income for the village was $13,205. About 3.7% of families and 4.8% of the population were below the poverty line, including 1.7% of those under age 18 and none of those age 65 or over.

Notable person

 Joe Zdeb, outfielder for the Kansas City Royals

References

Villages in Lee County, Illinois
Villages in Illinois
Populated places established in 1841
1841 establishments in Illinois